Mylabris phalerata is a species of blister beetle, belonging to the Meloidae family. Known as the Chinese blister beetle or the banded blister beetle, it is used in traditional Chinese medicine.

Morphology 
The adults of this species range from 25 mm to 34 mm long and 4 mm wide, with the average length of females being 33 mm and the average length of males being 26 mm. The adult beetles are black with large orange spots behind their head, followed by 2 wider orange bands.

The eggs of this species are smooth, orange, and banana shaped.

Life cycle 
This species lays eggs in the soil in August, and roughly 40 days later, in mid-September, the eggs hatch. The larvae go through five stages before they mature into an adult, the last being their overwintering stage, in which they spend six months in the soil before pupating in May and emerging in June as adults. Their developmental temperature range is 18 °C to 34 °C. The amount of time spend during their overwinter stage is determined by soil temperature.

Geographic distribution 
Mylabris phalerata is widely distributed in India and southern China; however, it is now scarce.

Impact 
When population levels are high, M. phalerata can be important pests of the flowers of the cowpea plant; they will destroy flowers and chew holes in the young pods.

Medical and research use 
Mylabris phalerata was traditionally used in Chinese medicine to treat tumors, carbuncle, scrofula, poor blood circulation, pleurisy, dropsy, pericarditis, and missed menstrual periods. Some side effects of the crude medicine obtained from M. phalerata can cause abdominal pain and hemorrhagic shock.

Today, M. phalerata is used for its chemical components, primarily cantharidin.

A fatality from cantharidin poisoning has been reported in which dried beetles had been used as an abortifacient.

References 

Meloidae
Beetles of Asia
Insects of China
Beetles described in 1781
Taxa named by Peter Simon Pallas